Glory By Honor XVII was a professional wrestling event produced by Ring of Honor (ROH), which took place on October 12, 2019 at the UNO Lakefront Arena in New Orleans, Louisiana.

Storylines
Glory By Honor XVII will feature professional wrestling matches, involving different wrestlers from pre-existing scripted feuds, plots, and storylines that played out on ROH's television programs. Wrestlers portrayed villains or heroes as they followed a series of events that built tension and culminated in a wrestling match or series of matches.

Results

See also
2019 in professional wrestling
List of Ring of Honor pay-per-view events

References

External links
Ring of Honor's official website

2019 in professional wrestling
2019 in Louisiana
Events in New Orleans
Professional wrestling in New Orleans
Glory By Honor
October 2019 events in the United States